Santacruz (station code: STC) is the name of a railway station on the Mumbai suburban railway on the Western Line and Harbour Line. The station began operations in October 1888. The neighborhood is Santacruz.

The station is an access point to Juhu (to the west), Kalina, and Vakola (to the east). Santacruz was one of the most affected areas by the 11 July 2006 Mumbai train bombings.

It is served by both the main Western Line and the Harbour Line. It has six platforms and eight tracks i.e. 2 Harbour Line numbered platform 5 & 6 (the 1st two lines in the overview image), 2 Main Line (first platform where the train is standing numbered platform 1 & 2, Line 2 is adjacent to it) and while Fast trains don't stop here, it has two platforms for fast trains also (far right in the overview image) numbered 3 & 4. Running alongside them is the 7th & 8th track that is used by long-distance trains that are bound for Bandra Terminus.

Like most suburbs in Mumbai, the railway station is served by the BEST service. Santacruz East has a large bus terminus (far end of the overview image).

Gallery

References

Railway stations in Mumbai Suburban district
Mumbai Suburban Railway stations
Mumbai WR railway division
Railway stations in India opened in 1888